National Tertiary Route 918, or just Route 918 (or ) is a National Road Route of Costa Rica, located in the Guanacaste province.

Description
In Guanacaste province the route covers Liberia canton (Liberia district).

References

Highways in Costa Rica